Carla Dragone Forte (born 11 January 1994) is a Brazilian former professional tennis player.

Forte has career-high WTA rankings of 421 in singles, achieved in August 2012, and 303 in doubles, reached in October 2013. She won one singles title and eleven doubles titles on the ITF Circuit.

Forte made her WTA Tour main-draw debut at the 2013 Brasil Tennis Cup in the doubles event, partnering Beatriz Haddad Maia. The pair reached the quarterfinals, losing to Kristina Barrois and Tatjana Malek.

ITF Circuit finals

Singles: 3 (1 title, 2 runner-ups)

Doubles (11 titles, 7 runner-ups)

External links
 
 

1994 births
Living people
Tennis players from São Paulo
Brazilian female tennis players
20th-century Brazilian women
21st-century Brazilian women